Trilj is a municipality and town in inland Dalmatia, Croatia. It is located northeast of Split.

Population

The total population of the municipality is 9,109, with 2,076 in Trilj itself and the rest in small villages. The list of settlements is as follows:

 Bisko, population 395
 Budimir, population 106
 Čačvina, population 93
 Čaporice, population 389
 Gardun, population 83
 Grab, population 546
 Jabuka, population 306
 Kamensko, population 107
 Košute, population 1,740
 Krivodol, population 2
 Ljut, population 5
 , population 139
 Podi, population 13
 Rože, population 32
 Strizirep, population 31
 Strmendolac, population 181
 Tijarica, population 374
 Trilj, population 2,076
 Ugljane, population 398
 Vedrine, population 851
 Velić, population 288
 Vinine, population 24
 Vojnić Sinjski, population 577
 Voštane, population 42
 Vrabač, population 218
 Vrpolje, population 93

History
In the area of Trilj there are many archaeological findings dating way back to Mesolithic. The first ethnic group that inhabited this area are the Illyrian tribe Delmati. Delmati people lived in a hill forts along the communication lines that connected their capital Delminium with the Adriatic coast. Hundred and fifty years of fierce fighting against the Romans (165 BC.- 9. AD) ended in defeat of Delmati people, after which Romans built the legionary fortress Tilurium on the hill above Trilj.

Tilurium Roman legionary fortress
At the top of the hill of Gardun, just 1 km south of Trilj, remains of a legionary fortress at Tilurium can be found. Tilurium guarded the entrance to the Cetina valley from the south and the approach to the provincial capital at Salona.

Čačvina fortification
Čačvina Castle is a fortification that guarded approach from Bosnia during the wars with the Ottomans. The first written record of this fortification dates to 1345. First written record of fortification dates to 1345.

Nutjak fortification
Nutjak fortification is situated at the entrance of the Cetina river canyon, on a cliff. Fortress was built in the 15th century by nobleman Žarko Dražojević to protect land west of Cetina river from Ottoman invasion.  

The village of Košute in the municipality is home to a monument to its war dead from the Second World War and the Croatian War of Independence.

Culture

Trilj Museum
Museum was found in 1996 for the purpose of presentation of artifacts from nearby archaeological site (Roman legionary fortress Tilurium). Along with archaeological artifacts in a part of the museum ethnographic collection from Trilj and surrounding area is presented.

Tourism
Trilj and surrounding area are popular tourist area, becoming more popular on annual basis. The area has rich history and offers great opportunities for outdoor activities and adventure Holidays. Surrounding is dominated, on one side by Cetina river that is very diverse with white waters and calm parts, and by mountains of dinaric alps on the other side. Some of the activities include Cetina river fishing, canoeing, rafting, Canyoning, horseback riding, cycling and hiking.

References

External links
 Trilj - Portal of Town Trilj (in Croatian)
 Town Trilj (in Croatian)

Cities and towns in Croatia
Populated places in Split-Dalmatia County